Clarkin is a surname. Notable people with the surname include:

Andrew Clarkin (1891–1955), Irish politician
Ian Clarkin (born 1995), American baseball player
John Clarkin (born 1872), Scottish footballer
John Paul Clarkin (born 1978), New Zealand polo player
Lucy Gertrude Clarkin (1876–1947), Canadian poet 
Matthew Clarkin (born 1981), British-born New Zealand rugby union player
Nina Clarkin, British polo player
Paul Clarkin (1950–2004), New Zealand polo player
Richard Clarkin, Canadian actor
Tony Clarkin (born 1946), British musician and record producer
Tony Clarkin (actor) (born 1952), Irish actor